William Macklin Stewart (September 23, 1914 – March 21, 1960) was a pitcher in Major League Baseball (MLB) who played during 1944 and 1945 for the Chicago Cubs.

Stewart's only MLB decision came on May 29, 1945, when the Cubs hosted the Brooklyn Dodgers at Wrigley Field. Stewart was the starting pitcher, but allowed 6 runs in only 2 innings; the Cubs would lose 10–3.

References

External links

1914 births
1960 deaths
Major League Baseball pitchers
Chicago Cubs players
Baseball players from Alabama
People from Stevenson, Alabama
Nashville Vols players